That's My Doc is a weekend Philippine comedy sitcom led by actor Aga Muhlach on ABS-CBN. It premiered on July 29, 2007 and ended on October 4, 2008 and was replaced by Banana Split.

Synopsis
This time, Dr. Agaton will play as a pediatrician, who decided to seek greener pastures in the United States by becoming a nurse. As it is his personal mission to help other people, Agaton gradually made his way up, and soon, he was recognized as one of the best nurses in the hospital he's working in! However, it seems that fame and fortune are unable to fill the longing in Agaton's heart. A pang of homesickness sets in, and he eventually decides to go back to the Philippines, and take a vacation with his Tita Ocs, his childhood guardian, while his own parents were in the States. Will he find what he's looking for here in the country?

Cast

Main cast
Aga Muhlach as Dr. Agaton "Doc Aga" Abogado
Raffy De Lara as Osmundo Flores 
Nova Villa as Octavella "Tita Ocs" Flores
Roderick Paulate as Major Ret Retualo
Bayani Agbayani as Buddy
Marietta Pokwang Subong as Cita
Celine Lim as Butching
Eda Nolan as Eda - Kikay Girl
Precious Lara Quigaman as Greta
Jake Cuenca as Jake
Kokong

Additional cast members of the show
Sophia Baars as Sofia
Jairus Aquino as Jai
Carlo Balmaceda as Bronson
Mikan Ong as himself
Ejay Falcon as Bronson (10 years after)
Rayver Cruz as Jai (10 years after)

Soundtrack
Theme song was sung by Bayani Agbayani.

See also
 Oki Doki Doc
 OK Fine, 'To Ang Gusto Nyo!
 List of programs broadcast by ABS-CBN

References

External links
 Official website
 That's My Doc at Telebisyon.net

ABS-CBN original programming
Philippine television sitcoms
2007 Philippine television series debuts
2008 Philippine television series endings
Filipino-language television shows